The Bureau of Consular Affairs (BOCA) is the agency of the Ministry of Foreign Affairs of the Republic of China (ROC) which provide passport services, visa services, document authentication and the coordination of emergency assistance to the ROC citizens abroad.

Organizational structure
Passport Administration Division
Visa Division
Document Authentication Division
Passport Issuing Division
Offices of the Secretariat, Accounting, Human Resources and Government Ethics
Information Management Unit
Congressional Liaison Unit
Legal Unit

Branch office
Taiwan Taoyuan International Airport

Transportation
The BOCA building is accessible by NTU Hospital Station of the Taipei Metro on the Red Line.

References

External links

Executive Yuan
Government of Taiwan
Consular affairs